LaShonda A. Hunt (born 1970) is an American lawyer who serves as a judge of the United States bankruptcy court of the Northern District of Illinois since 2017. She is a nominee to serve as a United States district judge of the United States District Court for the Northern District of Illinois.

Early life and education 

As a child, Hunt grew up poor and lived in public housing in Chicago. Hunt received a Bachelor of Science from the University of Illinois at Urbana-Champaign in 1992 and a Juris Doctor from the University of Michigan Law School in 1995.

Career 

From 1995 to 1998, Hunt was an associate at Sonnenschein Nath & Rosenthal LLP. From 1998 to 2001, she was a staff attorney for the United States Court of Appeals for the Seventh Circuit. From 2001 to 2003, she served as a law clerk for Judge William J. Hibbler on the United States District Court for the Northern District of Illinois. From 2003 to 2005 and then again from 2010 to 2015 she was an assistant United States attorney in the in the U.S. Attorney's Office for the Northern District of Illinois in the Civil Division. Hunt also worked as a schools project director for the Just the Beginning Foundation from 2006 to 2007 and was responsible for developing and implementing a national Summer Legal Institute for underrepresented high school students interested in legal careers. From 2007 to 2009, she was assistant general counsel at Exelon Company and from 2009 to 2010, she was the regulatory outreach manager at Com Ed, a subsidiary of Exelon. From 2015 to 2016, she  served as chief legal counsel for the Illinois Department of Corrections from 2015 to 2016.

Notable cases 

In 2004, Hunt represented a warden of a Leavenworth, Kansas prison in defending against a federal habeas corpus action.

In 2005, Hunt argued in defense of a Board of Immigration Appeals decision denying a Polish native’s petition to reopen her immigration status after finding that the plaintiff had failed to comply with a voluntary departure.

Bankruptcy court 

On January 6, 2017, she was appointed to a 14-year term as a United States Bankruptcy Judge of the Northern District of Illinois.

Nomination to district court 

In December 2021, Hunt was recommended to the president by Senators Dick Durbin and Tammy Duckworth. On January 18, 2023, President Joe Biden announced his intent to nominate Hunt to serve as a United States district judge of the United States District Court for the Northern District of Illinois. On January 31, 2023, her nomination was sent to the Senate. President Biden nominated Hunt to the seat vacated by Judge Charles Ronald Norgle Sr., who assumed senior status on October 4, 2022. Her nomination is pending before the Senate Judiciary Committee. On February 15, 2023, a hearing on her nomination was held before the Senate Judiciary Committee.

References

External links 

Living people
Year of birth missing (living people)
Place of birth missing (living people)
20th-century American women lawyers
20th-century American lawyers
21st-century American women judges
21st-century American judges
21st-century American women lawyers
21st-century American lawyers
African-American judges
African-American lawyers
Assistant United States Attorneys
Illinois lawyers
Judges of the United States bankruptcy courts
University of Illinois Urbana-Champaign alumni
University of Michigan Law School alumni